This is a list of films directed by Ernst Lubitsch. He made a total of 72 films (44 feature films and 28 short films) in a career that spanned 4 decades.

Director

Silent films

Sound films

Actor
 The Firm Gets Married (dir. Carl Wilhelm, 1914), as Moritz Abramowsky
 Bedingung – Kein Anhang! (dir. Stellan Rye, 1914), as Stella's husband
 Der Stolz der Firma (dir. Carl Wilhelm, 1914), as Siegmund Lachmann
 Miss Piccolo (dir. Franz Hofer, 1914), as Mr. Pinkeles
 Ein verliebter Racker (dir. Franz Hofer, 1915)
 Arme Marie (dir. Max Mack, Willy Zeyn, 1915), as Moritz Rosenthal
 Robert and Bertram (dir. Max Mack, 1915), as Max Edelstein
 Doktor Satansohn (dir. Edmund Edel, 1916), as Doktor Satansohn
 Der schwarze Moritz (dir. Georg Jacoby, 1916), as Moritz Apfelreis
 Leutnant auf Befehl (dir. Danny Kaden, 1916)
 Hans Trutz in the Land of Plenty (dir. Paul Wegener, 1917), as The Devil

Producer
 A Royal Scandal (1945)
 Dragonwyck (1946)

Notes

Director filmographies
 Filmography
American filmographies
German filmographies